This is a list of listed buildings in Hvidovre Municipality, Denmark.

The list

References

External links
 Danish Agency of Culture

Buildings and structures in Hvidovre Municipality
Hvidovre